Fidel Tricánico (5 May 1914 – 29 December 1992) was a Uruguayan boxer who competed in the 1936 Summer Olympics. In 1936 he was eliminated in the quarter-finals of the flyweight class after losing his fight to the upcoming gold medalist Willy Kaiser.

1936 Olympic results
 Round of 32: bye
 Round of 16: bye
 Quarterfinal: lost to Willy Kaiser (Germany) by decision

References

External links
 

1914 births
1992 deaths
Flyweight boxers
Olympic boxers of Uruguay
Boxers at the 1936 Summer Olympics
Uruguayan male boxers